In the 1970s in jazz, jazz became increasingly influenced by Latin jazz, combining rhythms from African and Latin American countries, often played on instruments such as conga, timbale, güiro, and claves, with jazz and classical harmonies played on typical jazz instruments (piano, double bass, etc.). Artists such as Chick Corea, John McLaughlin and Al Di Meola increasingly influenced the genre with jazz fusion, a hybrid form of jazz-rock fusion which was developed by combining jazz improvisation with rock rhythms, electric instruments, and the highly amplified stage sound of rock musicians such as Jimi Hendrix. All Music Guide states that "..until around 1967, the worlds of jazz and rock were nearly completely separate." However, "...as rock became more creative and its musicianship improved, and as some in the jazz world became bored with hard bop and did not want to play strictly avant-garde music, the two different idioms began to trade ideas and occasionally combine forces."
On June 16, 1972 the New York Jazz Museum opened in New York City at 125 West 55th Street in a one and one-half story building. It became the most important institution for jazz in the world with a 25,000 item archive, free concerts, exhibits, film programs, etc.

Miles Davis made the breakthrough into fusion in the 1970s with his album Bitches Brew. Musicians who worked with Davis formed the four most influential fusion groups: Weather Report and Mahavishnu Orchestra emerged in 1971 and were soon followed by Return to Forever and The Headhunters. Although jazz purists protested the blend of jazz and rock, some of jazz's significant innovators crossed over from the contemporary hard bop scene into fusion. Jazz fusion music often uses mixed meters, odd time signatures, syncopation, and complex chords and harmonies. In addition to using the electric instruments of rock, such as the electric guitar, electric bass, electric piano, and synthesizer keyboards, fusion also used the powerful amplification, "fuzz" pedals, wah-wah pedals, and other effects used by 1970s-era rock bands. Notable performers of jazz fusion included Miles Davis, keyboardists Joe Zawinul, Chick Corea, Herbie Hancock, vibraphonist Gary Burton, drummer Tony Williams, violinist Jean-Luc Ponty, guitarists Larry Coryell, Al Di Meola, John McLaughlin and Frank Zappa, saxophonist Wayne Shorter, and bassists Jaco Pastorius and Stanley Clarke. Jazz fusion was also popular in Japan where the band Casiopea released over thirty albums praising Jazz Fusion.

In the mid-1970s, jazz funk became popular, characterized by a strong back beat (groove), electrified sounds, and often, the presence of the first electronic analog synthesizers.  The integration of Funk, Soul, and R&B music and styles into jazz resulted in the creation of a genre whose spectrum is indeed quite wide and ranges from strong jazz improvisation to soul, funk or disco with jazz arrangements, jazz riffs, and jazz solos, and sometimes soul vocals.

1970s jazz standards
 1971 – "Spain". Jazz fusion composition by Chick Corea. First recorded on Return to Forever's Light as a Feather. The famous theme from the second movement of Joaquín Rodrigo's Concierto de Aranjuez is often used as an introduction for the song.
 1972 – "Little Sunflower". Composed by Freddie Hubbard with lyrics by Al Jarreau.
 1972 – "Red Clay". Jazz fusion composition by Freddie Hubbard.
 1972 – "Waters of March" – 1972 bossa nova song by Antonio Carlos Jobim. Known in Portuguese as "Águas de Março".
 1973 – "Chameleon". Jazz-funk composition by Herbie Hancock, Paul Jackson, Harvey Mason and Bennie Maupin, from Hancock's album Head Hunters.
 1973 – "Mr. Magic". Written by Ralph MacDonald and William Salter.
 1973 – "Send in the Clowns". Song by Stephen Sondheim from the musical A Little Night Music.
 1974 – "Beauty and the Beast". Jazz fusion composition by Wayne Shorter, from the album Native Dancer.
 1977 – "Birdland". Jazz fusion composition by Joe Zawinul. Originally released on Heavy Weather by Weather Report, it is instantly recognizable by bassist Jaco Pastorius' introduction using artificial harmonics, and notes sung by him by the end of the song. The tune was one of the biggest hits of the jazz fusion movement.

1970

Events
 July: Lee Morgan records Live at the Lighthouse at the Lighthouse Café in Hermosa Beach, California

Album releases

 Paul Bley: Improvisie
 Miles Davis: Bitches Brew
 Marion Brown: Afternoon of a Georgia Faun
 Alice Coltrane: Ptah, the El Daoud
 McCoy Tyner: Extensions
 Art Ensemble of Chicago: Les Stances a Sophie
 Sonny Sharrock: Monkey-Pockie-Boo
 Freddie Hubbard: Straight Life
 Art Ensemble of Chicago: Art Ensemble of Chicago with Fontella Bass
 Pharoah Sanders: Summon Bukmun Umyun
 Jan Garbarek: Afric Pepperbird
 Evan Parker: The Topography of the Lungs
 Herbie Hancock: Mwandishi
 Spontaneous Music Ensemble: So What Do You Think
 Alice Coltrane: Journey in Satchidananda
 Stanley Turrentine: Sugar
 Woody Shaw: Blackstone Legacy
 Freddie Hubbard: Red Clay
 McCoy Tyner: Asante
 Leon Thomas: Album
 Hubert Laws: Afro Classic
 John McLaughlin: My Goal's Beyond
 ICP Orchestra: Groupcomposing
 Guenter Hampel: People Symphony
 Keith Tippett: Dedicated To You But You Weren't Listening
 Misha Mengelberg: Instant Composers Pool 005
 Guenter Hampel: Ballet-Symphony
 Chris McGregor: And the Brotherhood of Breath
 Joe McPhee: Nation Time

Deaths
 Johnny Hodges (July 25, 1906 – May 11)
 Booker Ervin (October 31, 1930 – July 31)
 Albert Ayler (July 13, 1936 – November 25)

Births
 Harald Johnsen (March 21), Norwegian upright-bassist
 Simone (August 21), Norwegian singer
 Tord Gustavsen (October 5), Norwegian pianist
 Maria Kannegaard (October 6), Norwegian pianist

1971

Album releases

 Carla Bley: Escalator Over The Hill
 Charles Mingus: Let My Children Hear Music
 Paul Bley: Dual Unity
 Art Ensemble of Chicago: Phase One (1971) Mahavishnu Orchestra: The Inner Mounting Flame Weather Report: Weather Report Jean-Luc Ponty: Open Strings Pharoah Sanders: Black Unity Lol Coxhill: Ear of the Beholder Keith Jarrett: Facing You Mike Westbrook: Metropolis Willem Breuker: Instant Composers Pool 008 Jan Garbarek: Sart Chick Corea: The Gathering Keith Tippett: Septober Energy George Russell: Listen to the Silence Ornette Coleman: Science Fiction Spontaneous Music Ensemble: So What Do You Think Derek Bailey: Solo Guitar Freddie Hubbard: First Light Keith Jarrett: Expectations Chick Corea: Piano Improvisations Vol. 1 and Vol. 2 Joe Zawinul: Zawinul Joe McPhee: Trinity Oliver Nelson: Swiss Suite Terje Rypdal: Terje Rypdal Alice Coltrane: Universal Consciousness Paul Winter: Icarus Alice Coltrane: World Galaxy Paul Winter: Road Donald Byrd: Ethiopian Knights Tim Weisberg: Tim Weisberg Don Ellis: Tears of JoyDeaths
 Louis Armstrong (August 4, 1901 - July 6), singer and trumpeter
 Charlie Shavers (August 3, 1920 – July 8), trumpet player
 Wynton Kelly (December 2, 1931 — April 12), pianist

Births
 Stian Carstensen (January 5), Norwegian accordionist and multi-instrumentalist
 Øyvind Brandtsegg (February 16), Norwegian percussionist
 Kristin Asbjørnsen (May 12), Norwegian singer
 Erland Dahlen (May 15), Norwegian drummer
 Håvard Fossum (June 7), Norwegian saxophonist
 Ingebrigt Håker Flaten (September 23), Norwegian upright-bassist
 Helén Eriksen (October 19), Norwegian singer and saxophonist
 Frode Berg (October 24), Norwegian upright-bassist

1972

Events
 Grant Green records Live at the Lighthouse at the Lighthouse Café in Hermosa Beach, California

Album releases

 Anthony Braxton: Saxophone Improvisations Dave Holland: Conference of the Birds McCoy Tyner: Sahara London Jazz Composers Orchestra: Ode Weather Report: I Sing the Body Electric Jean-Luc Ponty: Sonata Erotica Herbie Hancock: Crossings John Surman: Westering Home Chick Corea: Light as a Feather Guenter Hampel: Familie Chick Corea: Return to Forever Paul Motian: Conception Vessel Neil Ardley: Symphony of Amaranths David Liebman: Open Sky Ornette Coleman: Skies of America Gato Barbieri: Bolivia Eric Kloss: One, Two, Free Gary Burton: Crystal Silence Guenter Hampel: Angel Albert Mangelsdorff: Trombirds Julius Hemphill: Dogon AD Randy Weston: Tanjah Guenter Hampel: Waltz For 11 Universes In A Corridor Joe Henderson: Black Is the Color Guenter Hampel: Broadway Nucleus: Belladonna Miles Davis: On The Corner Oregon: Music Of Another Present Era Paul Bley: Open, to Love George Russell: Living Time McCoy Tyner: Echoes of a Friend Mahavishnu Orchestra: Birds of Fire Stanley Cowell: Illusion Suite Stanley Clarke: Children of Forever Gary Bartz: Juju Street Songs Airto Moreira: FreeDeaths
 Lee Morgan (July 10, 1938 – February 19)
 Jimmy Rushing (August 26, 1901 - June 8)
 Kenny Dorham (August 30, 1924 - December 5)

Births
 Siri Gjære (February 1), Norwegian singer
 Christer Fredriksen (April 15), Norwegian guitarist
 Ketil Gutvik (July 4), Norwegian guitarist
 Roger Johansen (July 29), Norwegian drummer

1973

Album releases

 Sam Rivers: Streams Roland Kirk: Prepare Thyself To Deal With A Miracle Dollar Brand: Sangoma Art Ensemble of Chicago: Fanfare For The Warriors Don Cherry: Relativity Suite Cecil Taylor: Spring of Two Blue J's Keith Jarrett: Solo Concerts McCoy Tyner: Enlightenment Carla Bley: Tropic Appetites Dollar Brand: African Space Program Marion Brown: Geechee Recollections Herbie Hancock: Sextant Frank Wright: Church Number Nine Gato Barbieri: Latin America Frank Lowe: Black Beings Ralph Towner: Diary Dewey Redman: The Ear of the Behearer Eberhard Weber: The Colours of Chloë Roswell Rudd: Numatik Swing Band Oregon: Distant Hills Dollar Brand: African Portraits Weather Report: Sweetnighter David Liebman: Lookout Farm Oscar Peterson: The Trio Cecil Taylor: Solo John Surman: Morning Glory Betty Carter: Album Mal Waldron: Up Popped the Devil Michael Mantler: No Answer Billy Cobham: Spectrum Herbie Hancock: Head Hunters Spontaneous Music Ensemble: Mouthpiece Charles Earland: Leaving This Planet Flora Purim: Butterfly Dreams Herbie Hancock: Thrust Billy Cobham: CrosswindsDeaths
 Kid Ory (December 25, 1886 – January 23)
 Spanky DeBrest (April 24, 1937 – March 2)
 Willie "The Lion" Smith (November 23, 1893 – April 18)
 Eddie Condon (November 16, 1905 – August 4)
 Bill Harris (October 28, 1916 - August 21)
 Ben Webster (March 27, 1909 – September 20)
 Gene Krupa (January 15, 1909 – October 16)

Births
 Børre Dalhaug (April 29), Norwegian drummer
 Torbjørn Sletta Jacobsen (August 11), Norwegian saxophonist
 Wetle Holte (September 4), Norwegian drummer
 Thomas T. Dahl (September 7), Norwegian guitarist
 Eirik Hegdal (October 3), Norwegian saxophonist and band leader
 Christian Jaksjø (December 18), Norwegian trombonist

1974

Album releases

 Keith Jarrett: Belonging (ECM)
 Sam Rivers: Crystals Cecil Taylor: Silent Tongues Steve Lacy: Saxophone Special Jeanne Lee: Conspiracy Leo Smith: Reflectativity Weather Report: Mysterious Traveller Randy Weston: Blues To Africa  Marion Brown: Sweet Earth Flying Paul Rutherford: The Gentle Harm of the Bourgeoisie Marvin Peterson: Children of the Fire John Abercrombie: Timeless Roswell Rudd: Flexible Flyer McCoy Tyner: Atlantis Globe Unity Orchestra: Hamburg '74 Cecil McBee: Mutima  Mahavishnu Orchestra: Apocalypse Ralph Towner: Solstice Terje Rypdal: Whenever I Seem to Be Far Away Roscoe Mitchell: Solo Saxophone Concerts Steve Kuhn: Ecstasy Joe McPhee: Pieces of Light Keith Jarrett: Death and the Flower Steve Kuhn: Trance Steve Lacy: Scraps David Liebman: Drum Ode Kenny Barron: Peruvian Blue Tete Montoliu: Music for Perla Bill Watrous: Manhattan Wildlife Refuge Lonnie Liston Smith: Expansions Mike Gibbs: Only Chrome Waterfall McCoy Tyner: Sama Layuca Oregon: Winter Light Billy Cobham: Total EclipseDeaths

 Bobby Timmons (December 19, 1935 - March 1)
 Paul Gonsalves (July 12, 1920 - May 15)
 Duke Ellington (April 29, 1899 – May 24)
 Gene Ammons (April 14, 1925 – August 6)
 Tina Brooks (June 7, 1932 – August 13)
 Harry Carney (April 1, 1910 - October 8)

Births
 Kenneth Ekornes (July 7), Norwegian percussionist
 Line Horntveth (November 26), Norwegian tubist
 Anders Aarum (December 17), Norwegian pianist
 Knut Aalefjær (December 21), Norwegian drummer

1975

Album releases

 Keith Jarrett: The Köln Concert  Revolutionary Ensemble: The People's Republic Miles Davis: Agharta Evan Parker: Saxophone Solos  Leroy Jenkins: For Players Only  Air: Air Song  Oliver Lake: Heavy Spirits  Kenny Wheeler: Gnu High  Om: Kirikuki  Terje Rypdal: Odyssey Steve Lacy: Dreams Pat Metheny: Bright Size Life  Anthony Braxton: Five Pieces  Don Pullen: Solo Piano Album  Dexter Gordon: Bouncing' with Dex  Michael Mantler: Michael Mantler - Carla Bley  Sonny Sharrock: Paradise Dudu Pukwana: Diamond Express  Kenny Barron: Lucifer Frank Lowe: The Flam  John Surman: S.O.S. Don Pullen: Healing Force  Miles Davis: Get Up With It  Julius Hemphill: Coon Bid'ness  Gateway Trio: Gateway Collin Walcott: Cloud Dance  Don Moye: Sun Percussion  Martial Solal: Nothing But Piano  Eberhard Weber: Yellow Fields  Don Pullen: Five to Go  Charles Tolliver: Impact Lol Coxhill: Welfare State David Liebman: Forgotten Fantasies  Joe McPhee: The Willisau Concert  Yosuke Yamashita: Chiasma Michael Mantler: The Hapless Child  Dollar Brand: Soweto Don Pullen: Capricorn Rising  Stanley Clarke: Journey to Love  Enrico Rava: The Pilgrim and the Stars  Manhattan Transfer: Manhattan TransferDeaths
 Zutty Singleton (May 14, 1898 -July 14)
 Cannonball Adderley (September 15, 1928 – August 8)
 Oliver Nelson (June 4, 1932 – October 28)

Births
 Mats Eilertsen (March 4), Norwegian upright-bassist
 Lars Andreas Haug (April 12), Norwegian tubist
 Gunhild Carling (May 7), Swedish multi-instrumentalist
 Frode Haltli (May 15), Norwegian accordionist
 Erik Johannessen (July 22), Norwegian trombonist
 Håkon Mjåset Johansen (August 1), Norwegian drummer
 Espen Aalberg (October 12), Norwegian drummer

1976

Album releases

 Keith Jarrett: The Survivors' Suite  George E. Lewis: Solo Trombone Record  Miles Davis: Pangaea Air: Air Raid David Murray: Flowers for Albert  Derek Bailey: Company 1  Jan Garbarek: Dis Irene Schweizer: Wilde Senoritas  Toshiko Akiyoshi: Road Time  Albert Mangelsdorff: Tromboneliness  Leo Smith: Song of Humanity  Tony Coe: Zeitgeist Ornette Coleman: Dancing in Your Head  Jaco Pastorius: Jaco Pastorius Martial Solal: Movability Hamiet Bluiett: Endangered Species Art Lande: Rubisa Patrol  Chick Corea: Romantic Warrior  George Adams: Suite for Swingers  Jean-Luc Ponty: Imaginary Voyage  David Friesen: Star Dance  Dexter Gordon: Biting the Apple  Joachim Kuhn: Springfever  Eberhard Weber: The Following Morning  Lew Tabackin: Dual Nature  Chico Freeman: Morning Prayer Weather Report: Black Market Charles Tyler: Saga Out of the Outlaws  Al Di Meola: Land of the Midnight Sun Woody Shaw: Little Red's Fantasy  Stanley Clarke: School Days  Yosuke Yamashita: Banslikana  Ran Blake: Wende Guenter Christmann: Solomusiken Fuer Posaune und Kontrabasse  Egberto Gismondi: Danca Das Cabecas  Lenny White: Venusian SummerDeaths
 Ray Nance (December 10, 1913 - January 28)

Births
 Erlend Jentoft (March 16), Norwegian saxophonist
 Roger Arntzen (June 3), Norwegian upright-bassist
 Jarle Bernhoft (June 21), Norwegian singer and multiinstrumentalist
 Ivar Grydeland (October 1), Norwegian guitarist
 Jostein Gulbrandsen (October 19), Norwegian guitarist

1977

Album releases

 George E. Lewis: Chicago Slow Dance  Air: Air Time  George E. Lewis: Shadowgraph Joe McPhee: Graphics James Ulmer: Revealing Pat Metheny: Watercolors John Scofield: East Meets West  Leroy Jenkins: Solo Concert  Julius Hemphill: Blue Boye  Michael Mantler: Movies Abdul Wadud: By Myself  Roscoe Mitchell: Nonaah  Joanne Brackeen: Tring A Ling  Art Lande: Desert Marauders  Chico Freeman: Kings of Mali  Art Pepper: No Limit  Arthur Blythe: Metamorphosis Collin Walcott: Grazing Dreams  David Friesen: Waterfall Rainbow  Dave Holland: Emerald Tears  Neil Ardley: Kaleidoscope of Rainbows  Chico Freeman: Chico Frank Lowe: Lowe and Behold  Vinny Golia: Spirits In Fellowship  Weather Report: Heavy Weather  Ernie Krivda: Satanic Derek Bailey: Company 5  Chico Freeman: No Time Left  Paul Motian: Dance Hamiet Bluiett: SOS Jan Garbarek: Places World Saxophone Quartet: Point Of No Return  John Tchicai: Real Julius Hemphill: Raw Materials and Residuals  George Russell: Vertical Form 6  Joanne Brackeen: Aft Julius Hemphill: Roi Boye and the Gotham Minstrels  Kenny Wheeler: Deer Wan  Irene Schweizer: Hexensabbat  Leroy Jenkins: Lifelong Ambitions  Globe Unity: Pearls Ralph Towner: Sound and Shadows  Hamiet Bluiett: Birthright Jean-Luc Ponty: Enigmatic Ocean  Muhal Richard Abrams: 1-OQA+19  Cecil McBee: Music From the Source  Steve Lacy: Raps Woody Shaw: Rosewood Gateway Trio: 2 Louis Hayes: The Real Thing McCoy Tyner: Supertrio  Al Di Meola: Elegant Gypsy  Michael Urbaniak: Urbaniak  Keith Jarrett: My Song Arthur Blythe: Bush Baby Sheila Jordan: SheilaDeaths
 Erroll Garner (June 15, 1921 – January 2), pianist and composer
 Bennie Green (April 16, 1923 – March 23, 1977)
 Paul Desmond (November 25, 1924 – May 30)
 Rahsaan Roland Kirk (August 7, 1935 – December 5)

Births
 Torun Eriksen (January 8), Norwegian singer
 Kirsti Huke (March 6), Norwegian singer
 Mads Berven (May 23), Norwegian guitarist
 Frøy Aagre (June 8), Norwegian saxophonist
 Martin Horntveth (September 20), Norwegian drummer
 Tore Johansen (December 23), Norwegian trumpeter

1978

Album releases

 Leo Smith: The Mass on the World  Roscoe Mitchell: LRG-Maze-S II Examples  Leroy Jenkins: Legend of Ai Glatson  Rova Saxophone Quartet: Cinema Rovate  Gerry Hemingway: Kwambe  Sam Rivers: Waves George E. Lewis: Imaginary Suite  Don Pullen: Warriors Guenter Hampel: Oasis Cecil Taylor: 3 Phasis  John Oswald: Improvised Andrew Cyrille: Metamusicians' Stomp  Ralph Towner: Batik Art Ensemble of Chicago: Nice Guys Carla Bley: Musique Mecanique  Air: Open Air Suit  Marvin Peterson: The Light Anthony Davis: Of Blues and Dreams David Liebman: Pendulum Pat Metheny: Pat Metheny Group Ernie Krivda: The Alchemist Evan Parker: Monoceros Anthony Braxton: For Four Orchestras  Ganelin Trio: Concerto Grosso Cecil Taylor: Cecil Taylor Unit  James Ulmer: Tales of Captain Black  Oliver Lake: Life Dance Of Is  Lester Bowie: African Children  World Saxophone Quartet: Steppin' with  Arthur Blythe: Lenox Avenue Breakdown  Paul Winter: Common Ground Kenny Barron: Innocence Fred Anderson: Another Place Guenter Hampel: Freedom of the Universe  Dewey Redman: Soundsigns  Misha Mengelberg: Pech Onderweg  Max Roach & Anthony Braxton: Birth and Rebirth  Chico Freeman: The Outside Within  Egberto Gismondi: SoloDeaths
 Joe Marsala (January 4, 1907 – March 4)
 Larry Young (October 7, 1940 — March 30)
 Ray Noble (December 17, 1903 – April 3)
 Teddy Hill (December 7, 1909 - May 19)
 Joe Venuti (September 16, 1903 – August 14)
 Don Ellis (July 25, 1934 – December 17)

Births
 Børge-Are Halvorsen (October 12), Norwegian saxophonist
 Julie Dahle Aagård (December 30), Norwegian singer
 Daniel Heløy Davidsen (December 30), Danish-Norwegian guitarist

1979

Album releases

 Rova Saxophone Quartet: Removal of Secrecy Lesli Dalaba: Trumpet Songs And Dances Anthony Braxton: Alto Saxophone Improvisations Dollar Brand: African Marketplace Martial Solal: Four Keys Old And New Dreams: Old and New Dreams Terje Rypdal: Descendre Jack DeJohnette: Special Edition Andrew Cyrille: Nuba James Newton: Mystery School Art Pepper: Straight Life Anthony Davis: Hidden Voices Errol Parker: Doodles Niels-Henning Ørsted Pedersen: Dancing On The Tables Amina Claudine Myers: Song For Mother Earth George E. Lewis: Homage to Charles Parker Paul Motian: Le Voyage Bunky Green: Places We've Never Been John Surman: Upon Reflection Joseph Jarman: The Magic Triangle Max Roach & Anthony Braxton: One in Two Woody Shaw: Woody III Max Roach: Pictures In A Frame Ralph Towner: Solo Concert Kenny Wheeler: Around 6 Billy Bang: Distinction Without A Difference Cecil McBee: Alternate Spaces Fred Anderson: Dark Day Al Di Meola: Splendido Hotel String Trio of New York: First String Pat Metheny: American Garage Billy Bang: Sweet Space Paul Lytton: The Inclined Stick Warren Vaché: Polished Brass Eberhard Weber: Fluid Rustle Guenter Christmann: Weavers Michael Franks: Tiger in the Rain''

Deaths
 Grant Green (June 6, 1935January 31), American jazz guitarist and composer
 Charles Mingus (April 22, 1922January 5)
 Blue Mitchell (March 13, 1930May 21)
 Stan Kenton (December 15, 1911August 25)
 Wilbur Ware (September 8, 1923September 9)

Births
 Audun Ellingsen (January 4), Norwegian upright-bassist
 Mathias Eick (June 26), Norwegian trumpeter
 Ove Alexander Billington (August 10), Norwegian guitarist
 Jamie Cullum (August 20), British singer/songwriter, pianist, radio personality
 Tora Augestad (December 10), Norwegian singer

References

1970s in music
20th century in jazz
Jazz by decade
1970s decade overviews